The 1903–04 Columbia men's ice hockey season was the 8th season of play for the program.

Season
The team did not have a head coach but E. H. Updike served as team manager.

Note: Columbia University adopted the Lion as its mascot in 1910.

Roster

Standings

Schedule and Results

|-
!colspan=12 style=";" | Regular Season

† Yale records the score of the game as 5–2.‡ Cornell records the score of the game as 2–1.

References

Columbia Lions men's ice hockey seasons
Columbia
Columbia
Columbia
Columbia